Longevity myths are traditions about long-lived people (generally supercentenarians), either as individuals or groups of people, and practices that have been believed to confer longevity, but which current scientific evidence does not support, nor the reasons for the claims. While literal interpretations of such myths may appear to indicate extraordinarily long lifespans, many scholars believe such figures may be the result of incorrect translations of number systems through various languages, coupled along with the cultural and symbolic significance of certain numbers.

The phrase "longevity tradition" may include "purifications, rituals, longevity practices, meditations, and alchemy" that have been believed to confer greater human longevity, especially in Chinese Culture.

Modern science indicates various ways in which genetics, diet, and lifestyle affect human longevity. It also allows us to determine the age of human remains with a fair degree of precision.

Outside of mythology, the record for the maximum verified lifespan in the modern world is  years for women (Jeanne Calment) and 116 years for men (Jiroemon Kimura). Some scientists estimate that in case of the most ideal conditions people can live up to 127 years. This does not exclude the theoretical possibility that in the case of a fortunate combination of mutations there could be a person who lives longer. Though the lifespan of humans is one of the longest in nature, there are animals that live longer. For example, some individuals of the Galapagos tortoise are able to live more than 175 years, and some individuals of the bowhead whale more than 200 years. Some scientists cautiously suggest that the human body can have sufficient resources to live up to 150 years.

Extreme longevity claims in religion

Hebrew Bible (Old Testament) 

Several parts of the Hebrew Bible, including the Torah, Joshua, Job, and Chronicles, mention individuals with very long lifespans, up to the 969 years of Methuselah.

Some apologists explain these extreme ages as ancient mistranslations that converted the word "month" to "year", mistaking lunar cycles for solar ones: this would turn an age of 969 years into a more reasonable 969 lunar months, or about 78.3 solar years.

Donald Etz says that the Genesis 5 numbers were multiplied by ten by a later editor. These interpretations introduce an inconsistency: it would mean that the ages of the first nine patriarchs at fatherhood, ranging from 62 to 230 years in the manuscripts, would then be transformed into an implausible range such as 5 to  years. Others say that the first list, of only 10 names for 1,656 years, may contain generational gaps, which would have been represented by the lengthy lifetimes attributed to the patriarchs. Nineteenth-century critic Vincent Goehlert suggests the lifetimes "represented epochs merely, to which were given the names of the personages especially prominent in such epochs, who, in consequence of their comparatively long lives, were able to acquire an exalted influence".

Those biblical scholars that teach literal interpretation give explanations for the advanced ages of the early patriarchs. In one view, man was originally to have everlasting life, but as sin was introduced into the world by Adam, its influence became greater with each generation and God progressively shortened man's life. In a second view, before Noah's flood, a "firmament" over the earth contributed to people's advanced ages. 
Their days will be 120 years.

Christianity 
 Scolastica Oliveri is said to have lived in Bivona, Italy, 1448–1578 (age ), according to the archive of Monastero di San Paolo in Bivona located in Palermo.
 Around 1912, the Maharishi of Kailash was said by missionary Sadhu Sundar Singh to be a Christian hermit of over 300 years of age in a Himalayan mountain cave, with whom he spent some time in deep fellowship. Singh said the Maharishi was born in Alexandria, Egypt, and baptized by the nephew of St. Francis Xavier.

Falun Gong 
Chapter 2 of Falun Gong by Li Hongzhi (2001) states,

Hinduism 
The Hindu god Rama is said to have ruled his kingdom Ayodhya for 11,000 years by the time he died according to the Ramayana.
Rama's father Dasharatha lived for more than 60,000 years according to the Ramayana.
Bhagiratha did tapas for 1000 deva or god years (360,000 years in Human years) to please Ganga, to gain the release of his 60,000 great-uncles from the curse of saint Kapila. So, Bhagiratha lived for more than 360,000 years.
The Hindu god Krishna is said to have lived for 125 years and 8 months from 3228 BCE to 3102 BCE. According to Hindu scriptures, the age of Kali Yuga began after he ascended to his abode Vaikuntha.
Devraha Baba (died June 19, 1990) claimed to have lived for more than 900 years.
Trailanga Swami reportedly lived in Kashi since 1737; the journal Prabuddha Bharata puts his birth around 1607 CE, corresponding to year 1529 of the Shaka era (age ), upon his death in 1887.
The sadhaka Lokenath Brahmachari reportedly lived 1730–1890 (age ).
Shivapuri Baba, also known as Swami Govindanath Bharati, was a Hindu saint who purportedly lived from 1826 to 1963, making him allegedly  years old at the time of his death. He had 18 audiences with Queen Victoria.

Buddhism 
Vipassī, the twenty-second of twenty-eight Buddhas, lived for either 80,000 or 100,000 years. In Vipassī's time, the longevity of humans was 84,000 years.
Taṇhaṅkara, the first Buddha, lived for 100,000 years.

Islam

Ibrahim (إِبْرَاهِيم) was said to have lived to  years. His wife Sarah is the only woman in the Old Testament whose age is given. She died at 127.
In the Quran, Noah allegedly lived for 950 years with his people.

According to 19th-century scholars, Abdul Azziz al-Hafeed al-Habashi (عبد العزيز الحبشي) lived 673–674 Gregorian years, or  Islamic years, between 581 and 1276 AH.

In Twelver Shia Islam, Hujjat-Allah al-Mahdi is believed to currently be in occultation and still alive (age ).

Jainism
Extreme lifespans are ascribed to the Tirthankaras, for instance:
Neminatha was said to have lived for over 10,000 years before his ascension.
Naminatha was said to have lived for over 20,000 years before his ascension.
Munisuvrata was said to have lived for over 30,000 years before his ascension.
Māllīnātha was said to have lived for over 56,000 years before his ascension.
Aranatha was said to have lived for over 84,000 years before his ascension.
Kunthunatha was said to have lived for over 200,000 years before his ascension.
Shantinatha was said to have lived for over 800,000 years before his ascension.
Dharmanatha was said to have lived for over 2,500,000 years before his ascension.
Anantanatha was said to have lived for over 3,500,000 years before his ascension.
Vimalanatha was said to have lived for over 6,000,000 years before his ascension.
Vasupujya was said to have lived for over 7,200,000 years before his ascension.
Shreyansanatha was said to have lived for over 8,400,000 years before his ascension.

Theosophy/New Age 
 Babaji is said to be an "Unascended Master" purportedly many centuries old and is claimed to live in the Himalayas. The Hindu guru Paramhansa Yogananda claimed to have met him and was supposedly one of his disciples.

 Ashwatthama, the superhero of the Mahabharatha, is said to be over 6,000 years old and still alive.

Ancient extreme longevity claims
These include claims prior to approximately 150 AD, before the fall of the Roman empire.

China
Fu Xi (伏羲) was supposed to have lived for 197 years.
Lucian wrote about the "Seres" (a Chinese people), claiming they lived for over 300 years.
Zuo Ci who lived during the Three Kingdoms Period was said to have lived for 300 years.
In Chinese legend, Peng Zu was believed to have lived for over 800 years during the Yin Dynasty (殷朝, 16th to 11th centuries BC).
Emperors
The Yellow Emperor was said to have lived for 113 years.
Emperor Yao was said to have lived for 118 years.
Emperor Shun was said to have lived for 110 years.

Egypt
The Egyptian historian Manetho, drawing upon earlier sources, begins his Egyptian king list with the Graeco-Egyptian god Hephaestus (Ptah) who "was king for 9,000 years".

Greece
A book Macrobii ("Long-Livers") is a work devoted to longevity. It was attributed to the ancient Greek author Lucian, although it is now accepted that he could not have written it. Most examples given in it are lifespans of 80 to 100 years, but some are much longer:
Tiresias, the blind seer of Thebes, over 600 years.
Nestor, over 300 years.
 Members of the "Seres" (a Chinese people), over 300 years.

According to one tradition, Epimenides of Crete (7th, 6th centuries BC) lived nearly 300 years.

Japan

Some early emperors of Japan are said to have ruled for more than a century, according to the tradition documented in the Kojiki, viz., Emperor Jimmu and Emperor Kōan.

Emperor Jimmu (traditionally, 13 February 711 BC – 11 March 585 BC) lived 126 years according to the Kojiki. However, the form of his posthumous name suggests that it was invented in the reign of Kanmu (781–806), or possibly during the time in which legends about the origins of the Yamato dynasty were compiled into the Kojiki.
Emperor Kōan, according to Nihon Shoki, lived 137 years (from 427 BC to 291 BC).

Korea
Dangun, the first ruler of Korea, is said to have been born in 2333 BCE and to have died in 425 BCE at the age of 1,908 years.
Taejo of Goguryeo (46/47 – 165) is claimed to have reigned in Korea for 93 years beginning at age 7.

Persian empire
The reigns of several shahs in the Shahnameh, an epic poem by Ferdowsi, are given as longer than a century:
Zahhak, 1,000 years.
Jamshid, 700 years.
Fereydun, 500 years.
Askani, 200 years.
Kay Kāvus, 150 years.
Manuchehr, 120 years.
Lohrasp, 120 years.
Goshtasp, 120 years.

Ancient Rome
In Roman times, Pliny wrote about longevity records from the census carried out in 74 AD under Vespasian. In one region of Italy many people allegedly lived past 100; four were said to be 130, others up to 140.

Sumer
Age claims for the earliest eight Sumerian kings in the major recension of the Sumerian King List were in units and fractions of shar (3,600 years) and totaled 67 shar or 241,200 years.

In the only ten-king tablet recension of this list three kings (Alalngar, [...]kidunnu, and En-men-dur-ana) are recorded as having reigned 72,000 years together. The major recension assigns 43,200 years to the reign of En-men-lu-ana, and 36,000 years each to those of Alalngar and Dumuzid.

Vietnam
Kinh Dương Vương, the first King of Vietnam, is said to be born in 2919 BC and died in 2792 BC (aged about 127 years).
Lạc Long Quân reigned from 2793 BC to 2524 BC (about 269 years).

Medieval era

Poland
Piast Kołodziej, King of Poland, died in 861 at the alleged age of 120 (740 AD/861 AD).

Wales
Welsh bard Llywarch Hen (Heroic Elegies) died c. 500 in the parish of Llanvor, traditionally about age 150.

England
Edgar Ætheling, English prince who was briefly King of England after the death of Harold Godwinson at the Battle of Hastings in late 1066. Edgar is said to have died shortly after 1126, when William of Malmesbury wrote that he "now grows old in the country in privacy and quiet". However, two pipe rolls exist from the years 1158 and 1167 which list Edgar. The historian Edward Augustus Freeman stated that this referred either to Edgar (aged at least 115), to a son of his, or to another person who bore the title Ætheling.

Modern extreme longevity claims
This list includes claims of longevity of 130 and older from the 14th century onward. All birth year and age claims are alleged unless stated otherwise.

Documented
The following cases have been documented in detail over time.

Isolated

Other
 The Assamese polymath Sankardev (1449–1568) allegedly lived to the age of 118.
 Albrecht von Haller allegedly collected examples of 62 people ages 110–120, 29 ages 120–130, and 15 ages 130–140.
 A 1973 National Geographic article on longevity reported, as a very aged people, the Burusho–Hunza people in the Hunza Valley of the mountains of Pakistan.
 Swedish death registers contain detailed information on thousands of centenarians going back to 1749; the maximum age at death reported between 1751 and 1800 was 147.
 Cases of extreme longevity in the United Kingdom were listed by James Easton in 1799, who covered 1,712 cases documented between 66 BC and 1799, the year of publication; Charles Hulbert also edited a book containing a list of cases in 1825. 
 A periodical The Aesculapian Register, written by physicians and published in Philadelphia in 1824, listed a number of cases, including several purported to have lived over 130. The authors said the list was taken from the Dublin Magazine.
 Deaths officially reported in the Russian Empire in 1815 listed 1,068 centenarians, including 246 supercentenarians (50 at age 120–155 and one even older). Time magazine considered that, by the Soviet Union, longevity had elevated to a state-supported "Methuselah cult". The USSR insisted on its citizens' unrivaled longevity by claiming 592 people (224 male, 368 female) over age 120 in a 15 January 1959 census and 100 citizens of the Russian SSR alone aged 120 to 156 in March 1960. According to the opinion of Time magazine, in Georgia such claims were fostered by Georgian-born Joseph Stalin's apparent hope that such longevity might rub off on him. Zhores A. Medvedev, who demonstrated that all 500-plus claims failed birth-record validation and other tests, said that Stalin "liked the idea that [other] Georgians lived to be 100".
 An early 1812 Peterburgskaya Gazeta reports a man between ages 200 and 225 in the diocese of Yekaterinoslav (now Dnipro, Ukraine).
 An Anonymous lady lived for 116 years in Dhaka, Bangladesh until her death in 2018.
 Sher Ali Mia (from Bangladesh) is said to be born on 17 July 1894, making him  years old.

Practices

Diets 
The idea that certain diets can lead to extraordinary longevity (ages beyond 130) is not new. In 1909, Élie Metchnikoff believed that drinking goat's milk could confer extraordinary longevity. The Hunza diet, supposedly practiced in an area of northern Pakistan, has been claimed to give people the ability to live to 140 or more, but such claims are regarded as apocryphal.

Alchemy 
Traditions that have been believed to confer greater human longevity include alchemy.
Nicolas Flamel (early 1330s – c. 1418) was a 14th-century scrivener who developed a reputation as alchemist and creator of an "elixir of life" that conferred immortality upon himself and his wife Perenelle. His arcanely inscribed tombstone is preserved at the Musée de Cluny in Paris.
Fridericus (Ludovicus) Gualdus, author of "Revelation of the True Chemical Wisdom", lived in Venice in the 1680s. His age was reported in a letter in a contemporary Dutch newspaper to be over 400. By some accounts, when asked about a portrait he carried, he said it was of himself, painted by Titian (who died in 1576), but gave no explanation and left Venice the following morning. By another account, Gualdus left Venice due to religious accusations and died in 1724. The "Compass der Weisen" alludes to him as still alive in 1782 and nearly 600 years old.

Fountain of Youth 

The Fountain of Youth reputedly restores the youth of anyone who drinks of its waters. Herodotus attributes exceptional longevity to a fountain in the land of the Ethiopians. The lore of the Alexander Romance and of Al-Khidr describes such a fountain, and stories about the philosopher's stone, universal panaceas, and the elixir of life are widespread.

After the death of Juan Ponce de León, Gonzalo Fernández de Oviedo y Valdés wrote in Historia General y Natural de las Indias (1535) that Ponce de León was looking for the waters of Bimini to cure his aging on the expedition that led to the European discovery of Florida.

See Also

Gallery

Notes

References

Bibliography 

 
Demography
Mythological archetypes